M1918 may refer to:
 M114 155 mm howitzer
 M1918 Browning Automatic Rifle
 Beretta M1918
 M1918 light repair truck
 3-inch Gun M1918
 Ford 3-Ton M1918 World War I tank
 M1918 240 mm Howitzer
 Mauser 1918 T-Gewehr
 M1918M1 155mm Gun, US-made version of French Canon de 155mm GPF
 M1918 155mm Howitzer, US-made version of French Canon de 155 C modèle 1917 Schneider
 M1918 trench knife
(Under the old model-year nomenclature system many different pieces of equipment had the same model number.)

See also
 M1917 (disambiguation)
 M1919 (disambiguation)
 List of U.S. military vehicles by supply catalog designation